Abhimanyu Mithun (born 25 October 1989) is an Indian cricketer. A right-arm fast-medium bowler, Mithun was called up to the India squad for the first Test against South Africa in 2009–10, only ten weeks after making his first-class debut.  He has also played in the IPL for Royal Challengers Bangalore. In November 2019, he became the first bowler to take a hat-trick in all three domestic formats of top-level cricket in India. In first class cricket, he played for Karnataka, before retiring from the format in October 2021.

Playing career

As a teenager, Mithun was a [Javelin] thrower, competing at state-level.  Despite training at his father's gym throughout his teens, he failed to progress with his discus throwing, and a friend suggested that he join a cricket camp.  Until the age of 17, he hadn't bowled with a leather ball.

Royal Challengers Bangalore's head coach Ray Jennings eulogised about him, describing him as an "express bowler", but he had a quiet IPL.  His first-class debut reinvigorated the potential; he claimed six wickets in the first innings, followed by five wickets in the second, including a hat-trick.  During the ensuing season, he displayed his credentials, claiming another five-wicket haul, and taking 47 wickets to finish as the highest wicket-taker in the 2009–10 Ranji Trophy.

His call-up to the India national cricket team to replace the injured Sreesanth came little more than ten weeks after his first-class debut, but his Karnataka coach Sanath Kumar was not surprised; "From day one we knew he had the potential, he has the pace, bowling around 140kmh, and he has performed in every game, whether it is junior cricket or first-class cricket.

He made his debut in One Day Internationals in the third and final one day match against South Africa in the 2010 season. His Test debut was against Sri Lanka on 18 July 2010, at Galle, in which he claimed four wickets. He batted at No. 11 in the first innings, but after looking more solid than his fellow bowlers, he was promoted to No. 9 in the second innings and scored 25.

"But he was not given proper chances to play for India but he is good consistent bowler.In the 2015 Indian Premiere League, it was announced that he would be playing for Mumbai Indians as a good death bowler.

In July 2018, he was named in the squad for India Red for the 2018–19 Duleep Trophy. In October 2019, in the final of the 2019–20 Vijay Hazare Trophy, he took a hat-trick, with Karnataka going on to win the match. In November 2019, in the first semi-final of the 2019–20 Syed Mushtaq Ali Trophy, between Haryana and Karnataka, he took five wickets in one over, including a hat-trick.

On 7 October 2021, Abhhimanyu retired from first-class cricket.

Personal life 

Abhimanyu Mithun married Rayane, the daughter of actress Raadhika Sarathkumar on August 28, 2016. Their wedding was graced by the cricket and politics fraternity. and were blessed with a son on 7 June 2018 who they named Tarak and a they welcomed their second child a baby girl on March 18, 2020, who they named Radhya  derived from his wife's mother's name

References

External links
 
 Abhimanyu Mithun's profile page on Wisden
Abhimanyu Mithun

1989 births
Indian cricketers
India Test cricketers
India One Day International cricketers
Karnataka cricketers
Royal Challengers Bangalore cricketers
Sunrisers Hyderabad cricketers
South Zone cricketers
India Green cricketers
India Red cricketers
Living people
Cricketers from Bangalore